Azkend is an iOS tile-matching video game developed by Finnish 10tons Ltd and released on April 1, 2010. A sequel, Azkend 2: The World Beneath, was released on March 14, 2012.

Reception
AppSpy gave Azkend an 80, writing "The original Azkend was beautifully simple and visually stunning and Azkend HD for the iPad has focused on these aspects while adding a bit more of a challenge for fans of the game." NoDPad gave it 50, commenting "Azkend HD looks beautiful from an artist's standpoint, but beneath the outside beauty is a not-so-beautiful inside. I found the gameplay to be a bit repetitive, and I would have liked the audio to be a bit more in sync and not all over the place."

References

2010 video games
IOS games
IOS-only games
Tile-matching video games
Video games developed in Finland
10tons Entertainment games